Željin is a mountain in central Serbia, near the town of Vrnjačka Banja. It belongs to the Kopaonik mountain massif. Its highest peak Željin has an elevation of 1,785 meters above sea level.

References

Sources

Mountains of Serbia
Rhodope mountain range